EPA most commonly refers to the United States Environmental Protection Agency.

EPA may also refer to:

Environmental protection agencies/authorities

National government agencies/authorities 

 Ministry of Environmental Protection of the People's Republic of China, formerly the State Environmental Protection Agency
 Environmental Protection Agency (Ireland)
 Environmental Protection Agency (Maldives)
 Environmental Protection Authority (New Zealand)
 Scottish Environment Protection Agency
 Environmental Protection Agency (Sweden)
 Environmental Protection Administration (Taiwan)
 Pakistan Environmental Protection Agency

State government agencies/authorities

United States 

 California Environmental Protection Agency
 Illinois Environmental Protection Agency
 Ohio Environmental Protection Agency

Australia 
 Environment Protection Authority (South Australia), see 
 Environment Protection Authority (Victoria)
 Environmental Protection Agency (Queensland)
 Environmental Protection Authority of Western Australia
 New South Wales Environment Protection Authority

Law and treaties
 Emergency Powers Act (disambiguation)
 Environmental Protection Act (disambiguation)
 Economic partnership agreement, a free trade scheme between two countries
 Economic Partnership Agreements, a free trade scheme involving the European Union with the Group of African, Caribbean and Pacific countries
 Enduring power of attorney in law
 Equal Pay Act (disambiguation)
  European patent attorney, a legal specialization for Representation before the European Patent Office
 Établissement public à caractère administratif, a public law legal person in France

Organizations
 Europäisches Patentamt, the German name of the European Patent Office in Munich, Germany
 European Pathway Association, a clinical research organization
 European Privacy Association, lobby group
 European Pressphoto Agency, a news photo agency
 Eastern Provincial Airways, a former Canadian airline
 Eastern Psychological Association
 Euronext Paris, a stock exchange
 Eesti Põllumajandusakadeemia, now Estonian University of Life Sciences
 EPA Larnaca FC, a former Cypriot football club
 El Palomar Airport, an airport in Argentina (IATA airport code: EPA)
 Eglise Protestante d'Algérie, the Protestant Church of Algeria

Other uses
 East Palo Alto, California, a city in California
 Eastern Provincial Airways, Canada
 Eicosapentaenoic acid, an omega-3 fatty acid
 Electrostatic Protected Areas, see Electrostatic discharge
 English Pale Ale, beer in the Dark Star Brewery range
 English phonetic alphabet
 EPA tractor, an emergency tractor
 European Practice Assessment, pan-European development for quality management in primary health care
 Class designation for Reading electric multiple units